Patricia Rueda Perelló (born 20 October, 1976) is a Spanish businesswoman and politician who is a member of the Congress of Deputies for the Vox.

Biography
Rueda Perelló studied a degree in advertising and public relations at the University of Malaga and worked as a commercial director of various businesses, including as a corporate manager for the Cropani Palace and was the director of the Automobile and Fashion Museum in Malaga. She is married to Justo Fuentes, a Spanish businessman and director for Cadena COPE.

Political career
Rueda Perelló first joined Vox in 2016. In the April 2019 Spanish general election, she stood as a candidate for Vox and was elected to the Congress of Deputies for the Malaga constituency. She was re-elected in November 2019.

References 

1989 births
Living people
Members of the 13th Congress of Deputies (Spain)
Members of the 14th Congress of Deputies (Spain)
Vox (political party) politicians
Spanish women in politics